Brigadier general or Brigade general is a military rank used in many countries. The rank is usually above a colonel, and below a major general or divisional general. When appointed to a field command, a brigadier general is typically in command of a brigade consisting of around 4,000 troops (four battalions).

Variants

Brigadier general
Brigadier general (Brig. Gen.) is a military rank used in many countries. It is the lowest ranking general officer in some countries, usually sitting between the ranks of colonel and major general. When appointed to a field command, a brigadier general is typically in command of a brigade consisting of around 4,000 troops (four battalions).

In some countries, this rank is given the name of brigadier, which is usually equivalent to brigadier general in the armies of nations that use the rank.

The rank can be traced back to the militaries of Europe where a "brigadier general", or simply a "brigadier", would command a brigade in the field.

In the first quarter of the 20th century, British and Commonwealth armies used the rank of brigadier general as a temporary appointment, or as an honorary appointment on retirement; in the 1920s this practice changed to the use of brigadier, which was not classed as a general officer.

Brigade general
Brigade general is the rank of a brigade commander in countries where the French Revolutionary System's general officer rank designation is used.

The rank name  was first used in the French revolutionary armies.

It is used both brigadier general and major general because it is used for the designated rank of the general officers that the country stipulates as brigade commanders' class by law.

Brigadier general, Brigade general by country

Argentina

The rank of brigadier general (with some local variations) is used in the Argentine Air Force. Unlike other armed forces of the World, the rank of brigadier general is actually the highest rank in the Air Force. This is due to the use of the rank of brigadier and its derivatives to designate all general officers in the Air Force: brigadier (lowest general officer); brigadier-major (middle); and brigadier-general (highest). The rank of brigadier general is reserved for the Chief General Staff of the Air Force, as well as the Chief of the Joint General Staff if he should be an Air Force officer.

The Argentine Army does not use the rank of brigadier-general, instead using brigade general which in turn is the lowest general officer before Divisional General and Lieutenant General.

Australia

In the Australian Imperial Force during World War I, the rank of brigadier general was always temporary and held only while the officer was posted to a particular task, typically the command of a brigade. (Until 1915, Australian brigades were commanded by colonels.) When posted elsewhere, the rank would be relinquished and the former rank resumed. This policy prevented an accumulation of high-ranking general officers brought about by the relatively high turnover of brigade commanders. Brigadier general was also used as an honorary rank on retirement.

The rank insignia was like that of the current major general, but without the star/pip. Brigadier generals wore the same gorget patches (a line of gold oak leaf embroidery down the centre), cap badge (crossed sword and baton within a laurel wreath, surmounted by a crown in gold embroidery)  and cap visor (two rows of gold oakleaf embroidery) as other generals.

As in the United Kingdom, the rank was later replaced by colonel commandant in 1922 and brigadier in 1928. However, those holding the rank of brigadier general continued to do so throughout the inter-war period, until the last of them retired or was promoted during the Second World War. A brigadier general was a general officer, but brigadiers were not generals, which is shown by the rank insignia being like that of a colonel, but with an extra (third) star/pip, and a brigadier wore the same gorget patches (scarlet cloth with a line of crimson gimp), cap badge (the Royal Crest in gold embroidery), and cap visor (one row of gold oakleaf embroidery) as a colonel.

Bangladesh
Prior to 2001, the Bangladesh Army rank was known as brigadier, in conformity with the rank structure of the Commonwealth Nations. In 2001 the Bangladesh Army introduced the rank of brigadier general, however "the grade stayed equivalent to brigadier", and although classified as a "one-star rank", a brigadier general is not considered to be a general officer – the lowest ranking general officer is Major General. Brigadier general is equivalent to commodore of the Bangladesh Navy and air commodore of the Bangladesh Air Force. It is still more popularly called brigadier.

Belgium
However, in this small military there are no permanent promotions to this rank, and it is only awarded as a temporary promotion to a full colonel who assumes a post requiring the rank, notably in an international context (e.g. as military attaché in a major embassy).

Brazil

 (Brigade general) is the lowest rank amongst general officers of the Brazilian Army; i.e. like in most British Commonwealth counties, the lowest general officer rank is a two-star rank, and a General de Brigada wears a two-star insignia.  Hence, it is equivalent to the major general rank of many counties.  In the Brazilian Air Force, all of the senior ranks include 'Brigadeiro'; the two-star rank is Brigadeiro (Brigadier), the three-star rank is Major-Brigadeiro (Major-Brigadier), and the four-star rank is Tenente-Brigadeiro-do-Ar (Lieutenant-Air-Brigadier).

Canada

A brigadier-general is the lowest rank of general officer. A brigadier-general is senior to a colonel or naval captain, and junior to a major-general or rear-admiral.

The rank title brigadier-general is still used notwithstanding that brigades in the army are now commanded by colonels. Until the late 1990s brigades were commanded by brigadier-generals. In the air force context, brigadier-generals used to command air force groups until these bodies were abolished in the late 1990s.

The rank insignia for a brigadier-general on air force uniforms is a single wide braid on the cuff, as well as a single silver maple leaf beneath crossed sabre and baton, all surmounted by St. Edward's Crown, worn on the shoulder straps of the service dress jacket, and on slip-ons on other uniforms. The rank insignia on army uniforms is a gold maple leaf beneath crossed sword and baton, all surmounted by St. Edward's Crown, on the shoulder straps. On the visor of the service cap are two rows of gold oak leaves; the air force wedge cap features silver braid on the edges of the ear flaps. The cap insignia for a general officer is a modified version of the Canadian Forces insignia. Army brigadier-generals wear gorget patches on the collar of the service uniform tunic.

They are normally entitled to staff cars.

Until unification in 1968 of the Royal Canadian Air Force, Canadian Army, and the Royal Canadian Navy, rank structure and insignia followed the British pattern. This system of rank insignia was reinstated in 2014. In army usage, the term "brigadier" was used to denote what is now known as a brigadier-general while the air force used the rank of air commodore.

Chile
While the Chilean Air Force uses  for its one-star rank, two-star Air Force officers hold the rank of literally 'air brigade general'.

Colombia
The rank of brigadier general is the first general officer rank in the Fuerzas Militares, and the National Police.

France

France uses the rank of "brigade general". As with all French general officers, a French brigade general is titled "general" without any implication that he is an army general; for instance General Charles de Gaulle never rose higher than brigade general.

When rank insignia were introduced,  wore one star and a  wore two stars. During the French Revolution, the revolutionaries' drive to rationalise the state led to a change in the system of ranks. For this reason, in France, the rank corresponding to brigade general was changed to brigadier general after NATO was established on April 4, 1949, and before that, it corresponded to major general.

Nowadays, a French  generally commands a brigade. The rank can also be awarded in an honorary fashion to retiring colonels. The insignia are two stars, worn on the shoulder or at the sleeve of the uniform, depending on the order of dress. Two different kepis are issued: the service kepi sports the two stars, while the formal kepi features a large band of oak leaves (the kepi of a division general has two smaller such bands).

Charles de Gaulle held the rank of brigade general. He was given a temporary promotion to this rank in May 1940 as commander of the 4th Armoured Division. However his initial authority as head of the Free French really came from being the only cabinet member (Under-Secretary of State for National Defence and War) outside occupied France, not from his military rank. As a reminder of his war position, he refused any further promotion.

Ireland
The country is divided into two areas for administrative and operational reasons, and in each area there is an infantry brigade. The two brigade group structure envisages distinct operational areas of responsibility for each of the brigades and is supported in its responsibilities by the Naval Service and Air Corps. Each of the brigade formations and the Air Corps is commanded by a brigadier general, while the Naval Service is commanded by a commodore.

Italy
In the Italian Armed Forces the rank has different denominations. In the Army, the rank for combat arms officers is  whilst for the logistics and technical corps is called .

Mexico

Within the Mexican Armed Forces, there exists two grades of brigadier general. The general officer rank higher than the two brigadier generals is Divisional general.

Philippines
In the Philippines, Brigadier General (Philippine Army Philippine Air Force and Philippine Marines)/ Commodore (Philippine Navy and Philippine Coast Guard)/ Chief Superintendent (Bureau of Fire Protection and Bureau of Jail Management and Penology) / Police Brigadier General (Chief Superintendent before) (Philippine National Police)/ Gial De Brigada (1890-1902) (Philippine Revolutionary Army) is the lowest rank of generals but already eligible in the promotion to become Chief of Staff of the Armed Forces of the Philippines or PNP Chief of the Philippine National Police surpassing the Major General and Lieutenant General ranks.

Poland
 (abbreviated gen. bryg.) is the lowest ranking general in the Polish Land Forces and Air Force.

Portugal
In the Portuguese Army and Air Force, brigadeiro-general is a temporary general rank for the colonels that have to exercise a special command. It is the equivalent of the commodore rank in the Portuguese Navy.

The rank was reintroduced in 1999. Before that, simply as brigadeiro, it existed from 1707 to 1864 and again from 1929 to 1947, not being considered a general rank. From 1947 to 1999, brigadeiro become the two-star general rank in the Portuguese Army. As two-star rank, it was substituted by the rank of major-general in 1999.

Spain
In the Spanish Army, Spanish Air Force, and Spanish Marine Infantry (a branch of the )  is the lowest rank of general officers.

Turkey
Both  and - as military terms may owe their origins to the older Turkish word , meaning horsetail, which was used as a symbol of authority and rank in Ottoman and pre-Ottoman times.

United Kingdom

Brigadier-general was formerly a rank or appointment in the British Army and Royal Marines, and briefly in the Royal Air Force. The appointment was abolished in the Army and the Marines in 1921; the equivalent rank today is Brigadier.

United States

In the United States Army, United States Air Force, United States Marine Corps, and United States Space Force, a brigadier general is a one-star general officer. It is equivalent to the rank of rear admiral (lower half) in the other uniformed services.

Insignia

Army insignia

See also 

 British Army officer rank insignia
 Comparative military ranks
 History of Russian military ranks
 Military unit
 NATO Air Force officers
 NATO Army officers
 U.S. Army officer rank insignia
 United Kingdom and United States military ranks compared

Notes

References 

Bibliography

External links 
 

Military insignia
Military ranks of Australia
Military ranks of Canada
Military ranks of Romania
Former military ranks of the Royal Air Force
 
Military ranks
One-star officers
Military ranks of Singapore
Military ranks of the Nepali Army